The Woodland Hotel is located in Owen, Wisconsin. It was added to the National Register of Historic Places in 2016.

References

Hotel buildings on the National Register of Historic Places in Wisconsin
National Register of Historic Places in Clark County, Wisconsin
Hotels established in 1906
Hotel buildings completed in 1906
Tourist attractions in Clark County, Wisconsin
Neoclassical architecture in Wisconsin
1906 establishments in Wisconsin